Oreoi is a village and a former municipality in Euboea, Greece. It was named after the ancient town Oreus. Since the 2011 local government reform it is part of the municipality Istiaia-Aidipsos, of which it is a municipal unit. The municipal unit has an area of 49.913 km2. Population 3,017 (2011). It is situated on the northwest coast of the island Euboea, by the Oreoi Strait that connects the Aegean Sea with the North Euboean Gulf. The small port Agiokampos, 5 km west of Oreoi, is served by ferries to Glyfa on the mainland.

A large marble statue of a bull from a funerary monument of the 4th century B.C. was raised from the harbour of Oreoi in 1965, and is exhibited in the town.

Subdivisions
The municipal unit Oreoi is subdivided into the following communities (2011 census population in square brackets):
Oreoi [1,209]
Kastaniotissa [224]
Neos Pyrgos [786]
Taxiarchis [798]

History

Oreoi was named after the ancient town Oreus, that was also known as Histiaea. Oreus was situated at the eastern edge of the present village Oreoi. Oreoi was part of the municipality of Istiaia until 1912, when it became a separate community. It was elevated to municipality status in 1997. The last mayor of Oreoi, before it was merged into the new municipality Istiaia-Aidipsos, was Ioannis Stamatiou, elected in 2006.

References

Populated places in Euboea